State Route 20 (SR-20) is a state highway in southern Utah, running  in Iron and Garfield Counties, without directly serving or connecting any cities.  It serves as a truck connection between I-15 and US-89 and an access to Bryce Canyon National Park. It may also be used to travel between Salt Lake City and Phoenix, Arizona.  The highway follows the route of the Old Spanish Trail.

Route description

It ends at an intersection with US-89 at Bear Valley Junction. Trucks are routed from I-15 and US-89 onto SR-20 in preference to SR-9 and SR-14 to avoid steep grades and switchbacks required to cross the Markagunt Plateau. Because of this, SR-20 is included in the National Highway System. SR-20 itself is a difficult route, featuring 7% grades on the approaches to the  summit, and oversize vehicles are required to have a pilot escort.

History
The route of SR-20 was first used by non-Native Americans in 1864, by the settlers of Panguitch. It crosses the Tushar Mountains just south of the Old Spanish Trail's crossing.

The road from SR-1 (by 1926 US-91, now SR-271) in Paragonah to SR-11 (by 1926 US-89) at Bear Valley Junction was added to the state highway system in 1917. In 1927, the legislature assigned the State Route 20 designation to it, and in 1953 the west end was moved north to the present junction with I-15, removing Little Creek Canyon Road and Upper Bear Valley Road from the state highway system.

Major intersections

References

External links

020
 020
 020